The Heckler & Koch UMP (Universale Maschinenpistole, German for "Universal Machine Pistol") is a submachine gun developed and manufactured by Heckler & Koch. Heckler & Koch developed the UMP as a lighter and cheaper successor to the MP5, though both remain in production. The UMP has been adopted for use by various countries including Brazil, Canada, and the United States. A small number of UMPs chambered in .45 ACP were officially purchased by the 5th Special Forces Group of the United States Army Special Forces, with some of the weapons seeing limited service in the early years of the Iraqi insurgency, making them among the small number of submachine guns deployed by the U.S. military in recent conflicts.

History 
The UMP was designed in the 1990s by Heckler & Koch (H&K), as a cheaper, lighter alternative to the MP5, which made heavy use of polymers. The UMP first entered production in 2000. It was designed primarily for use by American military and law enforcement units, as the MP5 was not available in .45 ACP, a round which was popular in the United States, but not in Europe. Despite the UMP's improvements and reduced cost, it did not replace the MP5, which ended up outselling the UMP.

Design details

The UMP is a blowback-operated, magazine-fed submachine gun firing from a closed bolt. The closed bolt increases the weapon's accuracy, which is particularly desirable in a law enforcement context. However, the simple blowback design of the UMP makes it less controllable than the MP5.

As originally designed, the UMP is chambered for larger cartridges (.45 ACP and .40 S&W) than other submachine guns, to provide more stopping power against unarmoured targets, with slightly lower effectiveness at longer ranges. A larger cartridge produces more recoil, and makes it harder to control in fully automatic firing. To mitigate excessive recoil, Heckler & Koch designed the UMP to have a cyclic rate of fire of around 600 (±100) rounds per minute, though the rate of fire increases if (+ P) ammunition is used.

The UMP9 (the 9×19mm version of the UMP) is almost  lighter than the MP5. Its predominantly polymer construction reduces both its weight and the number of parts susceptible to corrosion.

The UMP is available in four trigger group configurations, featuring different combinations of semi-automatic, 2-round burst, fully automatic, and safe settings. It features a side-folding buttstock to reduce its length during transport. When the last round of the UMP is fired, the bolt locks open, and can be released via a catch on the left side. The iron sights consists of an aperture rear sight and a front ring with a vertical post. It can mount four Picatinny rails (one on top of the receiver, and one on the right, left, and the bottom of the handguard) for mounting accessories such as optical sights, tactical lights, or laser sights. Vertical foregrips can be attached to the bottom rail for better control during burst and automatic fire.

Variants 

The UMP is interchangeable between three different calibres:

The UMP45, chambered in .45 ACP

The UMP40, chambered in .40 S&W

The UMP9, chambered in 9×19mm Parabellum

Apart from the different chambering, all versions feature the same design model, the exterior differences being the curved magazine used on the UMP9, while both the UMP40 and UMP45 each use a straight magazine. All three versions of the weapon can be cross-converted to any of the round chamberings via replacing the bolt, barrel, and magazine.

The USC or Universal Self-loading Carbine is a semi-automatic variant of the UMP designed for civilian use. It was created following the Assault Weapons Ban of 1994 in the United States and was introduced in 2000. Changes from the original UMP include a "thumbhole" type stock/grip instead of the pistol grip of the UMP, a longer barrel without the flash suppressor, a magazine limited to 10 rounds, and a semi-automatic-only trigger group and action.
Originally available in gray, as of 2008 the USC came only in an all-black finish.
Production of the USC was halted in 2013.
In 2018 H&K announced a limited production run of new USC rifles.

Recall
In 2000, H&K recalled certain UMP and USC serial numbers due to faulty operating handles. The faulty handles, made of polymer, could break off, making the weapons inoperable.

Users

References

External links

2008 Heckler & Koch Military and LE brochure
Nazarian's Gun Recognition Guide – H&K UMP Demonstration (MOV)
The UMP at Modern Firearms

UMP
Post–Cold War weapons of Germany
.45 ACP submachine guns
.40 S&W submachine guns
9mm Parabellum submachine guns
Police weapons
Weapons and ammunition introduced in 2000